Cobetia amphilecti is a Gram-negative, aerobic, oxidase-negative, catalase-positive, bacterium. It has non-pigmented, rod-shaped cells, 0.8–0.9 µm in diameter and 1.1–1.3 µm long, motile by means of one polar and/or two or three lateral flagella. Growth is observed in 0–20 % NaCl with an optimum at 5% NaCl, and at 4–42 °C with an optimum at 37 °C. Growth is slow in the absence of NaCl and in the presence of 0.5% NaCl. Grows at pH 4.5–10.5 with an optimum at pH 6.5–8.5. Negative for hydrolysis of gelatin, starch, chitin, aesculin, xanthine, hypoxanthine and Tween 80. Negative for H2S production.

The halotolerant Cobetia amphilecti AMI6 produces glutaminase-free L-asparaginase (CobAsnase) with a molecular mass of 37 kDa on SDS-PAGE. The purified enzyme exhibits optimum activity at pH and temperature of 7.0 and 60 °C, respectively, with obvious thermal stability. It exhibits strict substrate specificity towards L-asparagine with no detectable activity on L-glutamine. Pre-treatment of potato slices by CobAsnase prior to frying reduced the acrylamide contents in the processed chips up to 81% compared with untreated control.

References 

Oceanospirillales